This is a list of television programs currently broadcast (in first-run or reruns), scheduled to be broadcast or formerly broadcast on Disney Channel, while the show was defunct on September 30, 2021. Owned by Disney Channels Korea Ltd., a joint venture between The Walt Disney Company (Korea), LLC, and the Disney Branded Television unit of Disney International Operations.

Former programming

Original series

Animated series
 Elena of Avalor (March 6, 2017 – December 11, 2020, first-run; September 27, 2021 – September 30, 2021, reruns)
 Milo Murphy's Law (April 1, 2017 – September 30 2021)
 Marvel's Spider-Man (May 20, 2018 – January 23, 2021, first-run; September 6, 2021 – September 30, 2021, reruns)
 Big City Greens (November 14, 2018 – September 30 2021)
 Marvel Future Avengers (April 20, 2019 – July 26, 2020, first-run; September 6, 2021 – September 30, 2021, reruns)
 Amphibia (September 18, 2019 – September 30, 2021)
 The Owl House (May 23, 2020 – September 30, 2021)
 Phineas and Ferb (July 1, 2011 – December 8, 2016, first-run; March 8, 2021 – April 16, 2021, reruns)
 Mickey Mouse and Friends
 Lilo & Stitch: The Series (June 4, 2012 – July 16, 2012, first-run; January 17, 2016 – January 24, 2016, reruns)
 Ultimate Spider-Man (July 7, 2012 – June 24, 2018)
 Gravity Falls (August 2, 2013 – February 24, 2017, first-run; July 5, 2021 – September 2, 2021, reruns)
 DuckTales (December 16, 2013 – February 28, 2014, first-run; December 1, 2015 – December 18, 2015, reruns)
 Wander Over Yonder (January 8, 2014 – September 21, 2016)
 Lego Star Wars: The New Yoda Chronicles (May 4, 2014 – December 28, 2014, first-run; October 27, 2015 – October 29, 2015, reruns)
 Liarla Pardo (April 15, 2018 – August 1, 2021, reruns)
 The 7D (October 20, 2014 – February 23, 2017, first-run; May 6, 2021 – August 1, 2021, reruns)
 Randy Cunningham: 9th Grade Ninja (November 3, 2014 – July 29, 2017)
 Star Wars Rebels (November 7, 2014 – June 15, 2018, first-run; August 22, 2021 – August 27, 2021, reruns)
 Penn Zero: Part-Time Hero (season 1; June 9, 2015 – July 21, 2017)
 Star vs. the Forces of Evil (June 15, 2015 – December 2, 2019, first-run; July 5, 2021 – July 30, 2021, reruns)
 Lego Star Wars: Droid Tales (August 14, 2015 – November 6, 2015, first-run; May 4, 2016, reruns)
 Bubble Cook Expedition (August 18, 2015 – September 21, 2015, first-run; August 1, 2021 – August 28, 2021, reruns)
 Stitch! (September 20, 2015 – October 30, 2015, reruns)
 Paper Town (October 19, 2015 – October 30, 2015, first-run; August 15, 2021 – August 28, 2021, reruns)
 Have a Laugh! (October 26, 2015 – November 5, 2015, reruns)
 Kim Possible (November 21, 2015 – November 29, 2015)
 Kick Buttowski: Suburban Daredevil (December 1, 2015 – December 31, 2015, reruns)
 Fish Hooks (February 5, 2016 – February 27, 2016, reruns)
 Lego Star Wars: The Yoda Chronicles (February 21, 2016, reruns)
 Lego Star Wars: The Freemaker Adventures (September 17, 2016 – January 14, 2018)
 Lego Star Wars: The Resistance Rises (September 17, 2016)
 Guardians of the Galaxy (April 24, 2017 – September 25, 2021)
 Pickle and Peanut (season 1; July 20, 2017 – August 24, 2017, first-run; September 2, 2017 – November 2, 2017, reruns)
 Rapunzel's Tangled Adventure (October 13, 2017 – June 20, 2020, first-run; July 26, 2021 – September 3, 2021, reruns)
 DuckTales (January 20, 2018 – May 15, 2021, first-run; July 5, 2021 – July 30, 2021, reruns)
 Billy Dilley's Super-Duper Subterranean Summer (August 3, 2018 – September 14, 2018)
 Big Hero 6: The Series (September 15, 2018 – May 5, 2021)
 Lego Star Wars: All-Stars (May 4, 2019 – May 26, 2019)
 101 Dalmatian Street (July 22, 2019 – April 12, 2021)
 Star Wars Resistance (season 1; January 5, 2020 –  March 22, 2020)

Live-action series
 Bunk'd (March 29, 2017 – September 30, 2021)
 Raven's Home (June 11, 2018 – September 30, 2021)
 Sydney to the Max (October 1, 2019 – September 30, 2021)
 Coop & Cami Ask the World (November 16, 2019 – September 30, 2021)
 Gabby Duran & the Unsittables (February 18, 2021 – September 30, 2021)
 Secrets of Sulphur Springs (August 9, 2021 – September 30, 2021)
 Just Roll with It (August 16, 2021 – September 30, 2021)
 Violetta  (August 12, 2012 - March 25, 2015, first-run; December 17, 2017 - February 25, 2018, Season 1 reruns)
 Austin & Ally (September 2, 2012 – February 15, 2017)
 Singibanggi Show (September 25, 2013 – November 13, 2013, first-run; September 1, 2019, reruns)
 Jessie (June 16, 2014 – June 10, 2017, first-run; January 6, 2021 – March 24, 2021, reruns)
 Shake It Up (June 16, 2014 – May 17, 2017, first-run; September 4, 2017 – September 10, 2017, reruns)
 Liv and Maddie (September 14, 2014 – May 3, 2020, first-run; September 27, 2021, reruns)
 Girl Meets World (March 15, 2015 – March 29, 2017)
 Evermoor (April 18, 2015 – May 3, 2015, first-run; February 20, 2016, reruns)
 The Mickey Mouse Club (Korean version; July 23, 2015 – December 17, 2015, first-run; June 21, 2021 – June 22, 2021, reruns)
 Wizards of Waverly Place (December 1, 2015 – May 19, 2020, first-run; September 30, 2020, reruns)
 Dog with a Blog (January 18, 2016 – April 25, 2016, first-run; September 5, 2016 – October 21, 2016, reruns)
 Hannah Montana (May 8, 2016 – February 27, 2017)
 The Suite Life of Zack & Cody (December 19, 2016 – January 31, 2017, reruns)
 Bizaardvark (February 1, 2017 – September 8, 2019, first-run; September 20, 2021 – September 21, 2021, reruns)
 I Didn't Do It (March 1, 2017 – March 28, 2017)
 Good Luck Charlie (March 4, 2017 – March 26, 2017, reruns)
 K.C. Undercover (June 12, 2017 – June 23, 2018, first-run; September 14, 2021 – September 18, 2021, reruns)
 Best Friends Whenever (July 31, 2017 – August 29, 2017)
 Wadda tv (August 26, 2017 – December 31, 2020, first-run; February 27, 2021 – August 12, 2021, reruns)
 Stuck in the Middle (September 11, 2017 – December 8, 2019, first-run; August 16, 2021 – August 30, 2021, reruns)
 Kirby Buckets (seasons 1 – 2; September 20, 2017 –  September 26, 2018)
 Lab Rats (December 18, 2017 – March 5, 2020, first-run; September 24, 2021, reruns)
 Walk the Prank (January 15, 2018 – August 27, 2019)
 A.N.T. Farm (February 12, 2018 – June 4, 2018, first-run; June 13, 2021 – July 26, 2021, reruns)
 Mech-X4 (season 1; March 19, 2018 – March 28, 2018)
 Liquid Monster Melang (April 19, 2018, first-run; August 28, 2021, reruns)
 Avengers Assemble (seasons 3 – 5; April 21, 2018 – February 7, 2021)
 Crash & Bernstein (July 9, 2018 – July 27, 2018)
 Mighty Med (season 1; August 16, 2018 – August 31, 2018)
 Finding Mickey (November 3, 2018 – December 15, 2018, first-run; June 15, 2019 – July 6, 2019, reruns)
 Imagination Movers (November 27, 2018 – January 4, 2019)
 Sonny with a Chance (January 29, 2019 – March 6, 2019)
 The Suite Life on Deck
 Kickin' It (March 25, 2019 – July 16, 2019)
 So Random! (April 3, 2019 – April 19, 2019)
 Zeke and Luther (April 22, 2019 – September 11, 2019)
 Ddudda tv (May 25, 2019 – October 12, 2019)
 Simkungwang (June 6, 2019, first-run; August 17, 2019, reruns)
 Bia (June 21, 2019 - August 5, 2021)
 Pair of Kings (June 25, 2019 – September 24, 2019)
 Fast Layne (September 26, 2019 – September 30, 2019)
 I'm in the Band (October 14, 2019 – November 8, 2019)
 PrankStars (November 13, 2019 – November 15, 2019)
 Aaron Stone (November 22, 2019 – December 25, 2019)
 Bug Juice: My Adventures at Camp (December 16, 2019 – January 7, 2020)
 Lab Rats: Elite Force (December 25, 2019 – January 4, 2020, first-run; June 24, 2021, reruns)
 Gamer's Guide to Pretty Much Everything (March 6, 2020 – March 26, 2020)
 The Lodge (March 27, 2020 – April 10, 2020)
 The Next Step (Canadian TV series)
 Win, Lose or Draw (April 10, 2020 – June 1, 2020, first-run; May 29, 2021 – May 30, 2021, reruns)
 Code: 9 (May 20, 2020 – May 23, 2020)
 Jonas (June 8, 2020 – August 21, 2020)
 Disney 11 (October 19, 2020 – July 27, 2021, first-run; August 16, 2021 – September 16, 2021, reruns)
 Disney Fam Jam (January 15, 2021 – January 24, 2021)
 Soy Luna
 Operación Triunfo (Spanish TV series)
 Operación Triunfo (series 1)
 Operación Triunfo (series 2)
 Operación Triunfo (series 3)
 Operación Triunfo (series 4)
 Operación Triunfo (series 5)
 Operación Triunfo (series 6)
 Operación Triunfo (series 7)
 Operación Triunfo (series 8)
 Operación Triunfo (series 9)
 Operación Triunfo (series 10)
 Operación Triunfo (series 11)

Short series
 Mickey Mouse (November 2013 – September 30, 2021)
 Take Two with Phineas and Ferb (Korean version; May 10, 2013 – July 23, 2013, first-run; August 15, 2019, reruns)
 Singibanggi Show Season 2 (September 20, 2014 – January 21, 2015, first-run, September 19, 2021, reruns)
 Descendants: Wicked World (season 1; September 11, 2016 – September 25, 2016, first-run; October 2, 2016 – October 9, 2016, reruns)
 Majjang Matchup (November 21, 2019 – January 10, 2020, reruns)

Acquired series
 Patito Feo

Anime
 Doraemon (1973 TV series)
 Doraemon (1979 TV series)
 Doraemon (2005 TV series)
 Lilpri
 Kirarin Revolution
 Kira Kira Happy Hirake! Cocotama (July 20, 2019 – May 16, 2020)
 Mermaid Melody Pichi Pichi Pitch (피치피치핏치)
 PriPara (February 11, 2016 – February 15, 2019, first-run; September 9, 2021 – September 13, 2021, reruns)
 Pokémon anime
 Pokémon (TV series)
 Pretty Rhythm: Rainbow Live                              
 Yo-kai Watch (seasons 1 – 2; December 12, 2016 – October 12, 2017, first-run; February 23, 2020 – July 22, 2020, reruns)
 Jewelpet: Magical Change
 Ojamajo Doremi
 Zoobles! (TV series)

Animated series
 Miraculous: Tales of Ladybug and Cat Noir (December 7, 2015 – September 30, 2021)
 PJ Masks (April 6, 2016 – September 30, 2021)
 The Octonauts (April 3, 2017 – September 30, 2021)
 Hotel Transylvania: The Series (December 21, 2017 – September 30, 2021)
 Idol Time PriPara (February 22, 2019 – August 28, 2020, first-run; August 2, 2021 – September 30, 2021)
 Gigantosaurus (June 17, 2019 – September 30, 2021)
 Catch! Teenieping (April 17, 2020 – April 8, 2021, first-run; present, reruns)
 Rolling Stars (September 15, 2020 – September 27, 2020, first-run; September 20, 2021 – present, reruns)
 Time Traveler Luke (October 8, 2020 – August 20, 2021, first-run; present, reruns)
 Galaxy Guards (May 7, 2021 – July 30, 2021, first-run; August 2, 2021 – present, reruns)
 Shaun the Sheep (2011 – March 10, 2019, first-run; May 22, 2019 – May 30, 2020, reruns)
 A Kind of Magic (June 3, 2012 – July 29, 2012)
 Mirmo Zibang! (July 16, 2012 – August 1, 2012, first-run; December 6, 2014 – February 18, 2015, reruns)
 Pororo the Little Penguin (November 7, 2012 – December 11, 2016, first-run; August 29, 2020, reruns)
 Wild About Safety (November 14, 2012 – February 2, 2020)
 Dude, That's My Ghost! (June 10, 2013 – February 1, 2014, first-run; January 2, 2017 – January 31, 2017, reruns)
 Kaibutsu-kun (July 22, 2013 – October 24, 2013, first-run; October 5, 2015 – October 23, 2015, reruns)
 Zig & Sharko (August 31, 2013 – December 1, 2017)
 Camp Lakebottom (December 30, 2013 – April 8, 2016)
 I'm Mongni (January 6, 2014 – July 18, 2014, first-run; September 4, 2021 – September 15, 2021, reruns)
 Noddy in Toyland (February 9, 2014 – February 25, 2015, first-run; October 5, 2015 – October 23, 2015, reruns)
 Gokujō!! Mecha Mote Iinchō (June 14, 2014 – September 7, 2014, reruns)
 Line Town (June 16, 2014 – September 5, 2014)
 Duda & Dada (July 2, 2014 – July 18, 2014, first-run; April 13, 2017, reruns)
 Numb Chucks (July 26, 2014 – January 21, 2015, first-run; June 4, 2018 – June 17, 2018, reruns)
 Zack & Quack (September 1, 2014 – September 22, 2014, first-run; April 23, 2019 – April 24, 2019, reruns)
 Gokujō!! Mecha Mote Iinchō Second Collection (September 7, 2014 – November 30, 2014, reruns)
 Tayo the Little Bus (September 17, 2014 – February 17, 2017, first-run; September 5, 2019, reruns)
 Peg + Cat (November 3, 2014 – December 13, 2018, first-run; March 16, 2020 – April 3, 2020, reruns)
 George of the Jungle (November 3, 2014 – November 27, 2014, first-run; November 22, 2015 – November 24, 2015, reruns)
 Alien Monkeys (November 24, 2014 – April 17, 2015, first-run; April 12, 2018 – April 13, 2018, reruns)
 Ben & Holly's Little Kingdom (December 5, 2014 – December 22, 2014, first-run; September 30, 2019 – December 13, 2019, reruns)
 Bellbug Popo (January 12, 2015 – January 29, 2015, first-run; November 21, 2020, reruns)
 Grami's Circus Show (January 14, 2015 – February 12, 2015, first-run; February 7, 2018 – February 10, 2018, reruns)
 Kongsuni and Friends (seasons 1 – 2, 6; February 28, 2015 – December 20, 2020)
 Legends of Chima (February 23, 2015 – March 18, 2015)
 The Smurfs (February 23, 2015 – January 29, 2016, first-run; March 23, 2018 – April 13, 2018, reruns)
 Buru & Forest Friends (March 17, 2015 – March 18, 2015, reruns)
 Rocket Monkeys (April 8, 2015 – July 1, 2015, first-run; September 30, 2016 – November 4, 2016, reruns)
 Dooly the Little Dinosaur (May 11, 2015 – June 22, 2015, first-run; July 17, 2018 – July 18, 2018, reruns)
 Space Jungle  (June 1, 2015 – April 4, 2017, first-run; December 1, 2017, reruns)
 Zip Zip (June 23, 2015 – March 11, 2016, first-run; March 25, 2020 – March 27, 2020, reruns)
 Muffy and Jemjem (July 22, 2015 – August 16, 2015, first-run; June 1, 2021 – August 24, 2021, reruns)
 Wasimo (August 24, 2015 – February 3, 2016, first-run; November 7, 2016 – December 9, 2016, reruns)
 The Koala Brothers (August 31, 2015 – October 28, 2015, first-run; July 11, 2018 – July 20, 2018, reruns)
 Dobi Dobi Mansion (September 22, 2015 – October 4, 2015, first-run; September 5, 2021 – September 16, 2021, reruns)
 The Adventures of Pim & Pom (September 23, 2015 – October 29, 2015)
 The Hive (October 5, 2015 –  December 23, 2015)
 Olivia (October 5, 2015 – October 30, 2015, reruns)
 Peanuts (October 5, 2015 – December 9, 2016)
 The Cat in the Hat Knows a Lot About That! (November 2, 2015 – November 27, 2015)
 Pocoyo (November 5, 2015 – November 27, 2015, first-run; December 1, 2015 – December 4, 2015, reruns)
 Black Rubber Shoes (season 4; November 9, 2015 – November 30, 2015, first-run; August 6, 2018 – November 6, 2018, reruns)
 Art Odyssey (November 19, 2015 – March 2, 2016, first-run; September 14, 2021 – September 24, 2021, reruns)
 Hi Totobi (November 21, 2015 – March 25, 2017, first-run; August 9, 2021 – August 23, 2021, reruns)
 Super Hams Band (November 29, 2015 – April 1, 2016, first-run; June 4, 2021 – June 16, 2021, reruns)
 Chloe's Closet (December 1, 2015 – February 29, 2016, reruns)
 Larva and Friends in My Arms (December 7, 2015 – March 20, 2016, first-run; September 6, 2018 – September 7, 2018, reruns)
 Super Hams Band 2 (December 22, 2015 – April 2, 2016, first-run; July 4, 2021 – July 25, 2021, reruns)
 Kids CSI (December 24, 2015 – May 8, 2016, first-run; September 6, 2021, reruns)
 Mouk (January 4, 2016 – January 29, 2016, first-run; December 16, 2019 – December 20, 2019, reruns)
 Eori Story (January 25, 2016 – March 28, 2016, first-run; July 23, 2018 – July 26, 2018, reruns)
 We are Detectives (January 27, 2016 – May 9, 2016, first-run; May 14, 2018 – May 18, 2018, reruns)
 Lego City (January 29, 2016 – January 31, 2016)
 King of Jungle, Saro (February 21, 2016 – February 22, 2016, first-run, June 12, 2018 – June 13, 2018, reruns)
 Kim Possible
 Robot Train (February 22, 2016 – March 14, 2016, first-run; January 1, 2021, reruns)
 Pretty Rhythm: Dear My Future (February 24, 2016 – March 21, 2016, first-run; June 5, 2021 – June 18, 2021, reruns)
 Toad Patrol (March 15, 2016 – March 31, 2016, first-run; November 16, 2019, reruns)
 Spookiz (April 8, 2016 – April 22, 2016, first-run; August 29, 2021, reruns)
 Canimals (April 21, 2016 – June 24, 2016, first-run; October 16, 2018 – January 21, 2019, reruns)
 The Quarreling Wonderland (April 25, 2016 – August 28, 2016, first-run; December 1, 2018 – December 4, 2018, reruns)
 Thomas & Friends (May 2, 2016 – December 9, 2016, first-run; May 7, 2019 – May 31, 2019, reruns)
 Hello Jadoo (seasons 1 – 2; May 11, 2016 – August 14, 2018)
 Galaxy Kids (May 12, 2016 – May 24, 2017, first-run; May 10, 2019 – May 11, 2019, reruns)
 Fairytale Science Expedition (May 24, 2016 – May 25, 2016, first-run; January 2, 2019 – January 4, 2019, reruns)
 Magic Scientists Club (May 26, 2016 – May 27, 2016, first-run; September 3, 2021 – September 14, 2021, reruns)
 Mumu and Pupu (May 28, 2016 – May 29, 2016, first-run; December 12, 2018 – December 13, 2018, reruns)
 Eungkka Sonata (May 30, 2016 – May 31, 2016, first-run; January 4, 2019 – January 5, 2019, reruns)
 Full Moon Factory (June 11, 2016 – October 9, 2016, first-run; May 4, 2020 – May 14, 2020, reruns)
 Robocar Poli (June 23, 2016 – May 31, 2019, first-run; July 5, 2021 – July 26, 2021, reruns)
 Super Wings (June 26, 2016 – November 13, 2020, first-run; July 10, 2021 – August 30, 2021, reruns)
 The Adventures of Baram (June 28, 2016 – June 29, 2016, first-run; June 8, 2019 – June 9, 2019, reruns)
 Packages from Planet X (July 1, 2016 – September 23, 2016)
 Danger Mouse (July 18, 2016 – October 13, 2016, first-run; August 22, 2018 – August 23, 2018, reruns)
 Bubble Bubble Cook (July 24, 2016 – September 28, 2016, first-run; April 16, 2019 – April 22, 2019, reruns)
 Little Groom Kung (July 28, 2016 – July 31, 2016, first-run; March 14, 2019 – March 17, 2019, reruns)
 Kamisama Minarai: Himitsu no Cocotama (August 1, 2016 – April 27, 2019, first-run; June 27, 2021 – June 29, 2021, reruns)
 Secret Jouju (seasons 7 – 9; September 5, 2016 – October 14, 2016, first-run; October 26, 2020 – November 17, 2020, reruns)
 Lego Nexo Knights (season 2; September 11, 2016 – December 18, 2016)
 Brave Fire Engine Ray (September 22, 2016 – October 10, 2016, first-run; July 16, 2020, reruns)
 Cocomong (September 26, 2016 – April 22, 2017, first-run; April 13, 2020 – April 22, 2020, reruns)
 Tree Fu Tom (October 24, 2016 – December 4, 2016)
 The Forks with Spiky Hands (October 24, 2016 – January 17, 2017, first-run; June 10, 2019 – June 11, 2019, reruns)
 Eggboy Koru (October 30, 2016, first-run; April 26, 2019, reruns)
 SofyRuby (November 4, 2016 – October 20, 2017, first-run; February 12, 2020 – February 13, 2020, reruns)
 Cuby Zoo (November 7, 2016 – June 20, 2017, first-run; July 23, 2021 – July 24, 2021, reruns)
 Hello Pawmily (November 7, 2016 – December 5, 2016, first-run; March 13, 2019, reruns)
 ModooModoo Show (November 24, 2016 – April 29, 2017, first-run; September 4, 2020 – September 14, 2020, reruns)
 Jungle Survival (November 28, 2016 – March 28, 2020, first-run; September 13, 2021 – September 19, 2021, reruns)
 T-Pang Rescue (November 30, 2016 – December 2, 2016, first-run; August 5, 2021 – August 25, 2021, reruns)
 Paw in Paw (December 5, 2016 – December 14, 2016, first-run; April 21, 2020, reruns)
 Atomic Puppet (December 14, 2016 – January 25, 2017, first-run; January 26, 2017 – February 23, 2017, reruns)
 Barnacle Lou (December 15, 2016 – January 2, 2017, first-run; April 20, 2020, reruns)
 Vroomiz (January 2, 2017 – June 4, 2017, first-run; November 23, 2020, reruns)
 Monk (January 3, 2017 – January 11, 2017, reruns)
 Flowering Heart (January 7, 2017 – February 18, 2017, first-run; July 15, 2020, reruns)
 Fish & Chips (February 11, 2017 – April 11, 2017, first-run; May 7, 2020 – May 20, 2020, reruns)
 Ninja Hattori (March 2, 2017 – April 28, 2017, reruns)
 Rolling with the Ronks! (April 15, 2017 – May 20, 2017, first-run; December 25, 2018 – December 27, 2018, reruns)
 Rocket Boy (May 1, 2017, reruns)
 Right Now Kapow (May 13, 2017 – October 29, 2017, first-run; December 21, 2018 – December 22, 2018, reruns)
 Molang (May 19, 2017 – July 14, 2017)
 Rilu Rilu Fairilu (May 22, 2017 – May 18, 2019, first-run; August 2, 2021 – September 24, 2021, reruns)
 The Sound of Heart (season 1; June 21, 2017 – September 9, 2017)
 Atashin'chi (July 10, 2017 – June 30, 2020)
 Naughty Nuts (July 22, 2017 – October 13, 2017, first-run; August 29, 2021, reruns)
 Rainbow Ruby (July 27, 2017 – January 18, 2021)
 Banzi's Secret Diary (season 1; October 25, 2017 – May 11, 2018, first-run; September 5, 2020 – September 18, 2020, reruns)
 Sing with Pinkfong (November 13, 2017 – December 22, 2017)
 Lego Ninjago: Masters of Spinjitzu (November 28, 2017, reruns)
 GoGo Dino (December 21, 2017 – February 26, 2021)
 Star Wars: The Clone Wars (seasons 1 – 6; December 25, 2017 – January 20, 2019, first-run; September 22, 2021 – September 23, 2021, reruns)
 Calimero (January 8, 2018 – August 13, 2018, first-run; September 23, 2019 – December 13, 2019, reruns)
 The Little Farmer Rabby (March 9, 2018 – August 31, 2018, first-run; January 19, 2021, reruns)
 Remi & Solla
 Katuri (April 16, 2018 – November 7, 2018)
 My Little Pony: Friendship Is Magic (seasons 1, 5 – 8; May 8, 2018 – July 25, 2020, first-run; July 13, 2021 – July 30, 2021, reruns)
 Oscar's Oasis (May 10, 2018 – May 11, 2018, reruns)
 Larva (August 16, 2018 – August 17, 2018, reruns)
 Go Away, Unicorn! (September 22, 2018 – March 31, 2021)
 Robot Train S2 (October 1, 2018 – July 1, 2019, first-run; September 1, 2021, reruns)
 Badanamu Cadets (December 3, 2018 – May 20, 2019, first-run; November 11, 2019 – November 29, 2019, reruns)
 Zombiedumb (season 2; January 5, 2019 – February 2, 2019, first-run; October 26, 2020 – October 28, 2020, reruns)
 Bo&To's Family (January 19, 2019 – August 11, 2019)
 Super Z (February 5, 2019 – April 11, 2021)
 Peppa Pig (seasons 1 – 3; February 11, 2019 – March 7, 2019)
 Teenie Scouts Big Five (October 19, 2019 – August 28, 2021)
 Sunny Bunnies (November 25, 2019 – April 20, 2020, first-run; June 1, 2020 – July 3, 2020, reruns)
 Let's Go to School, Kong (February 26, 2020 – February 27, 2020, first-run; June 19, 2021 – June 20, 2021, reruns)
 Pandarang (February 28, 2020 – February 29, 2020, first-run; June 10, 2021 – June 17, 2021, reruns)
 Jurassic Cops (March 29, 2020 – March 30, 2020, first-run; July 27, 2021 – July 29, 2021, reruns)
 Kiratto Pri Chan (April 3, 2020 – July 13, 2021)
 Hanging On! (May 4, 2020 – November 28, 2020)
 Z Rangers (May 13, 2020 – May 23, 2020, first-run; September 7, 2021 – September 17, 2021, reruns)
 Titipo Titipo (season 2; June 6, 2020 – August 29, 2020, first-run; August 31, 2020 – September 16, 2020, reruns)
 Mofy (July 1, 2020 – July 10, 2020)
 Journey of Long (July 31, 2020 – October 30, 2020, first-run; April 7, 2021 – June 4, 2021, reruns)
 Oops Ikooo (September 5, 2020 – September 14, 2020, first-run; September 10, 2021, reruns)
 Bloopies (November 24, 2020 – November 27, 2020, first-run; November 29, 2020 – December 13, 2020, reruns)
 Kongsuni Dancing Class (season 5; December 18, 2020 – June 25, 2021)
 Tish Tash (January 2, 2021 – March 27, 2021, first-run; May 3, 2021 – July 2, 2021, reruns)
 Secret Jouju: Guardians of Star (seasons 4 – 5; March 12, 2021 – June 28, 2021)
 Pretty Rhythm: Rainbow Live (July 1, 2021 – July 23, 2021, reruns)
 Franky & Friends (July 9, 2021 – July 27, 2021, reruns)
 Winx Club

Live-action series
 Dream High (August 4, 2012 – September 22, 2012, first-run; October 8, 2012 – November 2, 2012, reruns)
 Just Kidding (season 1; January 5, 2013 – March 31, 2013)
 Dream High 2 (July 22, 2013 – September 16, 2013, first-run; May 9, 2014 – June 22, 2014, reruns)
 Just for Laughs: Gags (May 5, 2014 – June 12, 2014, reruns)
 Hi! School – Love On (July 18, 2014 – December 26, 2014, first-run; July 6, 2015 – July 23, 2015, reruns)
 Disney English Reading Club (March 16, 2015, reruns)

Disney Junior series
A list of programs formerly broadcast on the Disney Junior programming block of Disney Channel.

 Doc McStuffins (September 3, 2012 – September 30, 2021)
 Sofia the First (July 26, 2013 – September 30, 2021)
 The Lion Guard (May 7, 2016 – September 30, 2021)
 Play-Doh on Disney Junior (April 24, 2017 – September 30, 2021)
 Mickey Mouse Mixed-Up Adventures (July 15, 2017 – September 30, 2021)
 Puppy Dog Pals (November 17, 2017 – September 30, 2021)
 Vampirina (April 16, 2018 – September 30, 2021)
 Muppet Babies (November 12, 2018 – September 30, 2021)
 Fancy Nancy (March 7, 2019 – September 30, 2021)
 T.O.T.S. (January 11, 2020 –September 30, 2021)
 The Rocketeer (October 15, 2020 – September 30, 2021)
 Mira, Royal Detective (October 19, 2020 – September 30, 2021)
 Jake and the Never Land Pirates
 Nina Needs to Go! (June 1, 2015 – July 3, 2015)
 Miles from Tomorrowland (July 24, 2015 – December 9, 2016, first-run; October 14, 2019 – November 1, 2019, reruns)
 Handy Manny (November 2, 2015 – January 29, 2016, first-run; March 4, 2019 – May 3, 2019, reruns)
 Sheriff Callie's Wild West (November 7, 2015 – November 6, 2016)
 Special Agent Oso (November 13, 2015 – April 28, 2017)
 Whisker Haven Tales With the Palace Pets (November 23, 2015 – November 27, 2015)
 Jungle Junction (January 4, 2016 – February 29, 2016, first-run; June 8, 2018 – July 10, 2018, reruns)
 My Friends Tigger & Pooh (March 5, 2018 – March 30, 2018, reruns)
 P. King Duckling (April 8, 2019 – May 7, 2019, reruns)
 Mickey Mouse Clubhouse (September 2, 2019 – September 27, 2019, reruns)
 Henry Hugglemonster (December 16, 2019 – December 20, 2019, reruns)

Films

 Cars
 Cars 2
 Cars 3
 Camp Rock
 Kim Possible: A Sitch in Time
 Kim Possible
 Kim Possible Movie: So the Drama
 High School Musical
 High School Musical 2
 High School Musical 3
  El Desafío
 High School Musical: O Desafio
 Hannah Montana & Miley Cyrus: Best of Both Worlds Concert
 Hannah Montana: The Movie
 Teen Beach Movie
 Teen Beach 2
 The Cheetah Girls
 The Cheetah Girls 2
 The Cheetah Girls: One World
 Tini: The New Life of Violetta
 Hocus Pocus
 Zombies
 Spin
 Princess Protection Program
 Zombies 2
 Zombies 3

References

Notes 

Disney Channel
Disney Channel related-lists